is a Japanese female announcer for Fuji Television.

Biography
Matsumura was born from Fujisawa, Kanagawa, she lived in Dallas for three and half years from fourth year in elementary school to first year of junior high school. After graduating from Keio Shonan-Fujisawa Junior and Senior High School and Keio University Faculty of Law Department of Political Science, she completed the same  Media Communications Research Institute and joined Fuji Television on 1 April 2009.

Matsumura belonged to the tennis club since junior high school and was a team captain at the tennis circle Aleks when she was under college in four years. She also likes to swim, ballet, figure skating, artistic gymnastics, basketball etc., and her body is so flexible that Y-shaped legs are possible.

While having a part-time job at college, Matsumura was involved in Nippon TV promotional model and telop input work etc. Announcer Minami Tanaka (currently freelancer) and other stations synchronized with tarentos Yuri Takami, Misato Nagano and others, Takami is particularly close friends such as her birthday is different from the same place for a day.

Matsumura's TOEIC score is 940 points, STEP Eiken quasi first grade etc., fluent in the English language, directly interviewing Hollywood stars and foreign athletic players without intermediary language interpretation, contacting English well with film watching, books, magazines, newspaper articles etc. to keep in mind.

In addition to tennis and golf as a hobby, she likes to visit tasty restaurants. Matsumura lists cuisine, English conversations, piano etc. as special skills.

On 30 June 2017, a day after her 31st birthday, she officially married with an actor, Tomonori Jinnai.

She announces her pregnancy with her first child on 14 June 2018, and she going maternity leave on September. On 31 October 2018, she gave birth to a healthy baby girl. She is back to work on August 13, 2020.

Current programmes

Occasional appearances

Former appearances

Special programmes

TV dramas

Fuji Pod

Radio appearances

Synchronization joined
Ayako Yamanaka
Yoshihito Fukui
Shingo Tatemoto

References

External links
 
 – AnaMaga Plus Blog 

Japanese sports announcers
Keio University alumni
People from Kanagawa Prefecture
1986 births
Living people
People from Fujisawa, Kanagawa